Evan Dunfee (born September 28, 1990) is a Canadian race walker and Olympian.  An Olympic and World medallist, Dunfee first set the Canadian record in the 50 kilometres race walk (at 3:41:38) at the 2016 Summer Olympics, where he placed fourth. He went on to win bronze medals at the 2019 World Athletics Championships and the 2020 Summer Olympics, both of those the last time the 50 km was to be featured as an event.

Career
He competed for his national team in the 50K walk at the 2013 World Championships, finishing in under 4 hours at 3:59:28. He won a bronze medal with his team at the 2013 World University Games where two of the winning Russian race walkers, Denis Strelkov and Andrey Ruzavin have since been suspended for doping violations.  Dunfee is the 2012 champion and record holder for the 20 km walk at the NACAC Under-23 Championships in Athletics. He was the silver medalist at the Athletics at the 2013 Jeux de la Francophonie. He has several near misses finishing fourth at the 2009 Pan American Race Walking Cup, the 2013 Pan American Race Walking Cup, 2015 Pan American Race Walking Cup and the 2012 Oceania Race Walking Championships and sixth at the 2010 Commonwealth Games usually very close to teammate and training partner Gomez.

Dunfee grew up and currently lives in Richmond, British Columbia, training up to 50 km a day. He attended Kingswood Elementary and Matthew McNair Secondary School in Richmond, British Columbia. He graduated from the University of British Columbia in 2014 with a Bachelor's degree in kinesiology. Dunfee Canadian Running Magazine. His investigative work on illegal doping-related activities by Russian competitors has been quoted by the Associated Press and Inside the Games. Additionally, he is a KidSport ambassador. In 2018, in support of KidSport's 25th anniversary, he raised funds and walked 25km a day for 25 days.

In July 2016, he was named to Canada's Olympic team for the 2016 Rio Olympics. In the 50-kilometre race walk, Hirooki Arai of Japan initially finished third.  He was then disqualified for making contact with Dunfee, but Arai's medal was reinstated on a further appeal. Dunfee advised the Canadian team against making a further appeal.  Dunfee set a new Canadian record in the event. He also competed in the 20-kilometre race walk, placing tenth.

After dealing with injuries, Dunfee took some time out from the sport in 2018 before beginning what he termed a restart with new goals. His work with KidSport to raise money for charity was part of an attempt to give him "a different avenue to chase [his] competitive spirit," and he credited it with reinvigorating him heading into the 2019 season. Competing at the 2019 World Athletics Championships in Doha, Dunfee won the bronze medal, the second medal for a Canadian in racewalk at the World Championships, and the first in the 50 km. This was the last time the 50 km was contested at the World Championships, a decision Dunfee indicated he disagreed with. He went on to say that his full focus was on preparing for the next Olympics.

Due to the COVID-19 pandemic, the 2020 Summer Olympics in Tokyo were delayed by a year. As in Doha, this was the last time the 50 kilometres race walk was to be a featured event at the Olympics. In the closing metres of the race, Dunfee surged into third place and won the bronze medal, becoming the third-ever Canadian racewalking Olympic medalist and the only one in the 50 km event. He said, "I don't need a medal to validate myself. I'm proud of what I accomplished today, but I have been dreaming of this moment and winning this medal for 21 years. I am over the moon." Dunfee's accomplishment in Tokyo was recognized by the Canadian association of national team athletes with their True Sport Award for the athlete who "exemplifies the highest values of sport, including sportsmanship, perseverance and inclusion" in December of 2021.

The transition to the 2022 season was difficult for Dunfee, who struggled with both a hamstring injury and depression relating to World Athletics' decision to retire from the 50 km event in favour of the new 35 km. He said it had "been a mental struggle for me, finding the motivation and mostly related to just coming to terms with the 50K not existing anymore, and that was so much of my identity." In his first major championship appearance in the new event, he finished seventh at the 2022 World Race Walking Team Championships in Muscat. He was sixth at the 2022 World Championships in Eugene, Oregon, which he said he was "thrilled" by in light of his recent difficulties. Later in the summer, Dunfee was named to the Canadian team for the 2022 Commonwealth Games in Birmingham, competing in the newly-added 10,000 m walk. He won the gold medal in a new national and Commonwealth Games record time of 38:36.37.

Dunfee is currently running for Richmond, British Columbia City Council in the 2022 British Columbia municipal elections.

Personal bests

Competition record

†: Guest appearance out of competition.

References

External links
 
 

1990 births
Living people
Athletes (track and field) at the 2010 Commonwealth Games
Athletes (track and field) at the 2015 Pan American Games
Athletes (track and field) at the 2019 Pan American Games
Pan American Games track and field athletes for Canada
Canadian male racewalkers
Commonwealth Games competitors for Canada
Pan American Games gold medalists for Canada
Pan American Games medalists in athletics (track and field)
People from Richmond, British Columbia
Sportspeople from British Columbia
University of British Columbia alumni
World Athletics Championships athletes for Canada
World Athletics Championships medalists
Athletes (track and field) at the 2016 Summer Olympics
Olympic track and field athletes of Canada
Universiade medalists in athletics (track and field)
Athletes (track and field) at the 2018 Commonwealth Games
Universiade bronze medalists for Canada
Medalists at the 2013 Summer Universiade
Medalists at the 2015 Pan American Games
Athletes (track and field) at the 2020 Summer Olympics
Medalists at the 2020 Summer Olympics
Olympic bronze medalists in athletics (track and field)
Olympic bronze medalists for Canada
Commonwealth Games gold medallists for Canada
Commonwealth Games medallists in athletics
Athletes (track and field) at the 2022 Commonwealth Games
Canadian sportsperson-politicians
Medallists at the 2022 Commonwealth Games